David Degen (born 15 February 1983 in Liestal) is a former Swiss footballer who last played for FC Basel, mostly as a right midfielder, in the Swiss Super League. He is half Dutch as his mother is from the Netherlands. His twin brother Philipp Degen was also a professional football player.

Club career
Degen started his youth football with local club FC Oberdorf. In 1996, he transferred to the youth teams of FC Basel playing in their U-18 and U-21 teams. He started his professional career at FC Aarau in 2000 but returned to Basel in 2003. With the club, during the Super League season 2003–04 and 2004–05, Degen won two domestic League Titels.

Degen moved to Bundesliga club Borussia Mönchengladbach in 2006. He played his debut for Mönchengladbach on 14 October 2006 in the game against VfL Wolfsburg and scored his first goal for his new club in that game. However, after the club's relegation in the Bundesliga season 2006–07 into the 2. Bundesliga, Borussia manager Jos Luhukay loaned him out to his former club, Basel for the 2007–08 season. On 22 August 2008, he returned to Switzerland on a permanent deal with BSC Young Boys. Degen spent four seasons in Bern playing 106 league matches and scoring 17 goals.

On 31 May 2012, Basel announced that they had signed Degen on a contract up until June 2015 together with his brother Philipp. He started his first game for his team following his return against Servette FC on 13 July and scored the winning goal to the 1–0 victory. At the end of the Swiss Super League season 2012–13 Degen won the Championship title and was Swiss Cup runner up with Basel. In the 2012–13 UEFA Europa League Basel advanced as far as the semi-finals, there being matched against the reigning UEFA Champions League holders Chelsea, but were knocked out being beaten 2–5 on aggregate.

At the end of the 2013–14 Super League season Degan won his fifth league championship with Basel. They also reached the final of the 2013–14 Swiss Cup, but were beaten 2–0 by Zürich after extra time. In the 2013–14 Champions League season Basel in the group stage finished the group in third position to qualify for Europa League knockout phase and here they advanced as far as the quarter-finals. After the season Degen retired from professional football.

International career 
Degen was selected for the Swiss 2006 World Cup squad. However, he only played in the warm-up games. Degen was left out of the squad to play at UEFA Euro 2008.

Honours 
Basel
 Swiss Super League: 2003–04, 2004–05, 2007–08, 2012–13, 2013–14
 Swiss Cup: 2002–03, 2007–08
 Uhren Cup: 2003, 2013

Club statistics

References

External links 
 David Degen & Philipp Degen Online – The Official Website 
 
 

1983 births
Living people
Swiss men's footballers
Switzerland youth international footballers
Switzerland under-21 international footballers
Switzerland international footballers
Swiss expatriate footballers
FC Aarau players
FC Basel players
BSC Young Boys players
Borussia Mönchengladbach players
2006 FIFA World Cup players
Bundesliga players
Expatriate footballers in Germany
Swiss Super League players
Swiss twins
People from Liestal
Twin sportspeople
Association football midfielders
Sportspeople from Basel-Landschaft